The El Pilar Fault System is a complex of geological faults located in state of Sucre in northern Venezuela. The fault system is of right-lateral strike-slip type and has an east–west orientation. Motion along the fault is largely transferred to the Warm Springs Fault in Trinidad Island.

References

Geography of Sucre (state)
Seismic faults of Venezuela
Strike-slip faults
Venezuelan Coastal Range